Émile Deckers (9 January 1885 – 6 February 1968) was a Belgian painter.

Life and career
Émile Deckers was born at Enisval in Belgium on 9 January 1885. He received his art education at the Académie royale des beaux-arts in Liège. He was the recipient of many art prizes before the outbreak of the first world war.

In 1921 he moved to Algiers, French Algeria, where he became an Orientalist painter. where he rapidly achieved a high level of popularity for his portraits.

Work
He executed many portraits of Algerian women.  His portraits of Arab people are thought to be very authentic.

His work has been auctioned by Christie's and Sotheby's.

See also
 List of Orientalist artists
 Orientalism

References

1885 births
1968 deaths
19th-century Belgian painters
19th-century Belgian male artists
20th-century Belgian painters
Belgian expatriates in Algeria
Orientalist painters
Artists from Liège
People from Algiers
People from Verviers
20th-century Belgian male artists